Kněžpole is a municipality and village in Uherské Hradiště District in the Zlín Region of the Czech Republic. It has about 1,100 inhabitants.

Geography
It lies in the northern part of the Lower Morava Valley. The rivers Morava and Březnice flow through the municipality (outside the village) and meet at its eastern tip.

References

Villages in Uherské Hradiště District